Pedro Henrique de Bragança e Ligne de Sousa Tavares Mascarenhas da Silva  (19 January 1718 - Granja de Alpriate, 26 June 1761), 1st Duke of Lafões was a Portuguese aristocrat, visionary and intellectualist of the 18th century who served as a magistrate in the role of Regent of Justice in the courts of King D. John V of Portugal and D. Joseph I of Portugal. Profoundly religious, the 1st Duke of Lafões was also the driving force and artistic vision behind Palacio do Grilo. This fact is closely related to being one of the strongest pretenders to the hand of the future Queen D. Maria I of Portugal, as well as the other uncle of D. Maria I - legitimate descendant of D. John V, D. Pedro III.

Education 
D. Pedro Henrique de Bragança was the first born son of Miguel of Braganza and D. Luísa Antonia Casimira de Sousa Nassau e Ligne. In disguise, present at the occasion of the future Duke's baptism was King D. João V, his uncle and godfather. The then Secretary of State, Diogo de Mendonça Corte-Real, declared that in this act His Majesty King D. João V made D. Pedro Henrique de Bragança Duke of Lafões.
D. Pedro Henrique de Bragança would be found countless times in his Library during his youth deeply interested in Philosophy and Geography in particular, although the Duke had a privileged education in all aspects of knowledge. Being fluent in European languages and also in the main Asian languages, he was also a scholar in sacred and profane history, both national and from other kingdoms.

Life and work 
D. Pedro was a man of a profoundly religious character, and the first place he visited when he arrived from his trips to his farms and villas outside the capital was the Confessionary. He was also the first at church on important occasions.
Although the Duke never married, he maintained a loving relationship with Luisa Clara of Portugal, the Myrtle Flower, which was not looked kindly upon by King D. João V. Eventually, after the intervention of Friar Gaspar da Encarnação, the King, godfather, and uncle to the Duke consented on the relationship, from which Ana de Bragança was born.
Pedro Henrique de Bragança being one of the main candidates to the hand of D. Maria I - together with Prince Peter III of Portugal - all his vision for the rebuilding of the Palacio do Grilo was always linked to somewhat of a dream-like realm, a certain architectural fantasy of an oneiric kingdom, made partly real.
However, D. Pedro became fatally ill a few months after the massive 1755 Lisbon earthquake, presumably due to his tireless efforts to rebuild the city, having been regularly seen carrying shovels, hoes, and lifeless bodies.

Final years 

D. Pedro was gravely ill for 4 years before dying in 1761, spending the last year exiled from the court of King Joseph I at his Quinta de Alpriate. The exile resulted as the royal punishment for D. Pedro de Bragança setting out all the candles in the Palace on the occasion of the marriage between King Peter III and Queen Mary I as they rode by within the royal chariot.

See also 

Duke of Lafões

References

1718 births
1761 deaths
People from Lisbon